How the Garcia Girls Spent Their Summer is a 2005 American comedy film starring America Ferrera. It was not released on DVD until May 16, 2008. The film won the Silver George for the Best Film of the Perspective competition at the  27th Moscow International Film Festival.

Premise
The plot concerns three generations of Garcia women in a sleepy Arizona town who experience a sexual awakening during the course of a summer: teenaged Blanca Garcia; her mother, Lolita; and her grandmother, Doña.

Doña, the matriarch of the family, decides to buy a car but doesn't know how to drive. Her gardener, a man named Don Pedro offers to teach her, and the relationship gradually turns from platonic to romantic.  Meanwhile, Doña's daughter, Lolita, is torn between her co-worker at the butcher shop where she works and Victor, a married man who frequently makes passes at women around town.  Seventeen-year-old Blanca falls for the new guy in town and learns about the joy and pain an intimate relationship can bring.

Throughout the story, the women struggle to sort out their sexual feelings while trying not to further damage their sometimes strained family relationship.  Most of the dialogue is in English, with occasional humorous digressions of old men sitting around talking in Spanish about their past experiences with cars and women.

Cast

References

External links 
 

2005 films
2005 comedy films
American comedy films
Films about Mexican Americans
2000s English-language films
2000s American films